Dadnab is a free text-messaging service that provides transit information in several major metropolitan areas throughout the United States.  Users of this service can use any text-message enabled cell phone or any other text-messaging device to send a request for information to one of Dadnab's phone numbers, and they can expect an instantaneous response.

Dadnab relies on transit authority databases for the information that it provides.  Queries can cover trip planning, location information, or help requests.  Typically, a Dadnab user will send a text message with an origin and destination to one of Dabnab's phone numbers, and will receive a text message seconds later with routes, stops, departure, transfer and arrival times. Users can also specify desired departure times in their queries.

Roger L. Cauvin, founder and operator of the service, is a longtime resident of Austin, Texas and a frequent user of public transportation.

Service Areas

	
 Austin, TX 
 San Francisco Bay Area
 Chicago, IL
 Dallas, TX
 Houston, TX

 Portland, OR
 Seattle, WA
 Southern California
 Tri-state NY/NJ/CT Area 
Boston, MA

External links
Official Website

References

Companies based in Austin, Texas